Raaduvere is a village in Jõgeva Parish, Jõgeva County in eastern Estonia.

See also 
 Kaevere

References

 

Villages in Jõgeva County